The network of Écoles nationales des sciences appliquées (ENSA) is a group of higher education Moroccan public schools delivering engineering courses under the system of French grandes écoles. It is the largest network of engineering schools in Morocco. In fact, this network includes 11 ENSA throughout the Kingdom; Agadir, Al Hoceima, El Jadida, Fes, Kenitra, Khouribga, Marrakech, Oujda, Safi, Tangier and Tetouan. The Forum "ENSA Maroc", organized by engineering students of ENSA Agadir, is the first high-level meeting between engineering students, professors and administrators of the network of National Schools of Applied Sciences throughout the Kingdom.

List of schools

Grounding
ENSA training lasts 5 years. After two years of preparatory integrated education these schools offer many courses in the engineering cycle

 ENSA Tanger
Telecommunication and Networks engineering
Computer science engineering
Electronic and Automatic Systems
Industrial engineering and Logistics
Energy and Environmental engineering
ENSA Oujda
Computer engineering
Electrical engineering
Industrial engineering
Telecommunications and Networks
Electronics and Industrial Computing and
Civil Engineering
ENSA Agadir
Computer engineering
Industrial engineering
Engineering Processes for Energy and the Environment
ENSA Safi
Industrial engineering
Telecommunication and Networks engineering
Computer engineering
Process engineering and ceramic materials
ENSA Fès
Computer engineering
Telecommunication and Networks engineering
Industrial engineering
Mechatronics engineering
Embedded engineering systems and industrial IT
ENSA Al Hoceima
Computer engineering
Civil engineering
Data engineering
Environmental engineering
Energy Engineering and Renewable Energies
ENSA El Jadida
Telecommunication and Networks engineering
Energy and power engineering
ENSA Kénitra
Computer engineering
Mechatronics engineering
Telecommunication and Networks engineering
Electrical engineering
Industrial engineering
ENSA Khouribga
Computer engineering
Telecommunication and Networks engineering
Engineering Processes for Energy and the Environment
Electrical engineering
ENSA Tétouan
Computer engineering
Telecommunication and Networks engineering
Mechatronics engineering
Logistics and Transportation engineering
Civil engineering
ENSA Marrakech
Computer engineering
Telecommunication and Networks engineering
Electrical engineering
Industrial engineering and logistics
ENSA Berrechid
aeronautical engineering
Information Systems Engineering and Big Data

References

External links
  Site du Forum ENSA Maroc
 Écoles du Maroc

Education in Morocco
Engineering universities and colleges